Phranc (born Susan Gottlieb; August 28, 1957), is an American singer-songwriter whose career began playing in several bands in the late 1970s Los Angeles punk rock scene. Her musical style later shifted during the 1980s as a solo artist, into a self-proclaimed "All-American Jewish lesbian folksinger."

Biography
Phranc was born Susan Gottlieb in Santa Monica, California, and grew up in Mar Vista, Los Angeles. She began her performing career in the late 1970s and early 1980s punk scene in Los Angeles. She had a bleached blonde crewcut and wore male attire, creating an androgynous persona for her first band, Nervous Gender, which formed in 1978. The writer V/D wrote of her for the punk fanzine Slash, "On stage, Phranc looks like a 14-year-old runaway from a boys' reform school." The band was influential in the development of what later came to be known as 'electropunk'. In 1980 she left Nervous Gender to join the punk band Catholic Discipline, in which Craig Lee (Bags) and Claude Bessy, journalist for Slash punk fanzine, were the lead singers. Phranc appears with Catholic Discipline in the 1980 documentary The Decline of Western Civilization. She was also in Castration Squad, a feminist, all-female punk band which featured Dinah Cancer of 45 Grave, Elissa Bello of The Go-Go's, Alice Bag of the Bags, Tracy Lea of Redd Kross, and Shannon Wilhelm.

In the 1980s, Phranc pursued a solo career. She performs in Paul Morrissey's film Madame Wang's (1981) as Phranque. She began playing an acoustic guitar and released Folksinger on Rhino Records in 1985. She opened for music acts such as The Smiths, Hüsker Dü, Violent Femmes, and Billy Bragg. She styled herself the "All-American Jewish Lesbian Folksinger" and with a wry sense of humour released the LP I Enjoy Being a Girl in 1989 on Island Records, appearing on the cover with her trademark 'flat top' hair style. Describing a live performance, Adam Block wrote "Phranc's unnerving androgyny (expressed with easy confidence) and her fervent opinions (couched in sly, laconic wit) make her a fascinating performer." Her third full-length recording, released in 1991, was Positively Phranc.

Phranc was an important influence on the Queercore movement, being acknowledged as such by Team Dresch in their song for her, "Uncle Phranc." In the 1990s many queercore bands and musicians involved in queercore music began collaborating with her. She appeared as a guest on the Team Dresch LP/CD Captain My Captain and, as well, members of Team Dresch, Tobi Vail of Bikini Kill, Patty Schemel of Hole and others have played with Phranc on her EP Goofyfoot and other songs. Phranc performs and is interviewed in the queercore documentary She's Real, Worse Than Queer by Lucy Thane, and she has appeared frequently at queercore events such as Olympia's Homo-a-go-go festival. In the 1990s Phranc performed "Hot August Phranc", performing as Neil Diamond. On her full-length CD of 1998, Milkman, she is joined by Steve MacDonald of Redd Kross, who plays bass. Her most recent releases, including Milkman, appear on her own independent record label, Phancy Records.

The 2001 documentary film, Lifetime Guarantee, directed by Lisa Udelson, chronicled Phranc's side job as a Tupperware demonstrator and manager. The documentary showed that despite Phranc's high sales and high-profile, her enthusiastic and sincere approach to the job, and her engaging manner and popularity among the sales force, Phranc was disappointed to find that the Tupperware corporation itself did not celebrate or even acknowledge her genuine achievements in sales and marketing for the company. Phranc was still selling Tupperware in 2008, but as of 2013 her online store was closed.

She still performs occasionally, but spends more time working on creative visual art projects, including the Cardboard Cobbler sculptures. In December 2007 she had a solo art show at Cue Art Foundation in New York City curated by Ann Magnuson; The New York Times review compared her work to Claes Oldenburg and Andy Warhol. Phranc had her first major West Coast solo show, at Craig Krull Gallery, June 18 to July 23, 2011, an exhibition made of beach themed cardboard and craft paper works. She continues to work in her Santa Monica studio and is represented by Krull.

Phranc was absent from her blog and Facebook from late 2011 to Spring 2014. Phranc announced in April 2014 that she had been prevented from participating in online activities due to an injury.

Personal life
Phranc lives in Santa Monica, California with her partner and children.

Discography

Exhibitions

Solo exhibitions
 2018 Swagger, Craig Krull Gallery, Santa Monica, CA
 2018 The Great Outdoors, Friesen Gallery, Ketchum, ID
 2018 Toys, Craig Krull Gallery, Santa Monica, CA
 2014 It Happened in Sun Valley, Friesen Gallery, Ketchum, ID,  	
 2014 Winter, Craig Krull Gallery, Santa Monica, CA, 2013 	
 2011 	Phranc & Co. Out West General Store, Museum of the American West, Autry National Center, Los Angeles, CA
 2011 	Phranc of California, Craig Krull Gallery, Santa Monica, CA
 2007 	Phranc, CUE Art Foundation, New York City
 2006 	Cardboard Cupcake, 12 Birthday celebration, 18 Street Arts Center, Santa Monica, CA
 2006 	Phranc of California, Eastside Studios, Los Angeles, CA
 2006 	Paper Play, W/ Alison Bechdel, Pine Street Art Works – Burlington, VT
 2005 	Carnalville, cardboard sign installation w/ TEADA, 18th Street Arts Center, Santa Monica, CA
 2004 	The Cardboard Cobbler "Valentines" 18th Street Art Center, Santa Monica, CA
 1994 	Storefront Installation "Phranc-O-Mat", Creative Time, 42nd Street Arts Project, New York, NY
 1992 	Brief Encounter, Three dimensional pop art show, Highways, Santa Monica, CA

Group exhibitions
 2014 	Incognito 10, Santa Monica Museum of Art, Santa Monica, CA
 2014 	Filtered: What Does Love Look Like?, Friesen Gallery Fine Art, Ketchum, ID
 2013 	Compass-Navigating the Journey to Self-Identity, Orange County Center for Contemporary Art, Santa Ana, CA
 2013 	This Side of the 405, Ben Maltz Gallery, Otis College of Art and Design, Los Angeles, CA
 2013 	#three, The Archer School for Girls, Los Angeles, CA
 2010 	The Man I Wish I Was, A.I.R. Gallery, Brooklyn, NY
 2009 	Support, Frederieke Taylor Gallery, New York, NY
 2008 	This Side Up: The Art of Cardboard, San Jose Museum of Art, San Jose, CA
 2008 	Grandmasters, Honoring Sheila DeBretteville, The Art Directors Club, New York, NY
 2008 	Pink and Bent, Leslie/Lohman Gallery, New York, NY
 2007 	Welcome Home, Arena 1 Gallery, Santa Monica, CA
 1999 	Forming: The early days of PUNK, Track 16 Gallery, Santa Monica, CA
 1994 	Group Show, White Columns, New York
 1978 	Books, Posters, Postcards, w/Cindy Marsh, The Woman's Building, Los Angeles, CA

References

External links

Official website 
Phranc's blog, focussing on her cardboard sculpture, now integrated with her website
Phranc's discography on queermusicheritage.com by JD Doyle
Crawdaddy! interview
Phranc at Craig Krull Gallery
Woman's Building History: Phranc (from Otis College) (video interview)

1957 births
Living people
American folk singers
American punk rock guitarists
Feminist musicians
Feminist artists
Women punk rock singers
Jewish American musicians
Lesbian Jews
Lesbian singers
Lesbian songwriters
American lesbian musicians
American LGBT singers
American LGBT songwriters
LGBT people from California
Singers from Los Angeles
Musicians from Santa Monica, California
Queercore musicians
Riot grrrl musicians
American folk guitarists
Jewish folk singers
Jews in punk rock
Guitarists from Los Angeles
20th-century American women singers
20th-century American women guitarists
20th-century LGBT people
21st-century LGBT people
21st-century American Jews
21st-century American women singers
21st-century American women guitarists